The 2017–18 season was the 106th season in CD Tenerife’s history.

Squad

Transfers
List of Spanish football transfers summer 2017#Tenerife

In

Out

Competitions

Overall

Liga

League table

Matches

Kickoff times are in CET.

Copa del Rey

References

CD Tenerife seasons
Tenerife